Edie Hooton is a former Democratic member of the Colorado House of Representatives. She represented District 10, which covered a portion of Boulder County. She was first elected in 2016, succeeding Dickey Lee Hullinghorst.

In her early political career, Hooton worked as an aide to Alaska State Senator Bettye Fahrenkamp and U.S. Senator Mike Gravel. She moved to Boulder County in 1997 and served as President of the Democratic Women of Boulder County before taking office.

Hooton serves on the House Energy & Environment Committee, the House Transportation & Local Government Committee, and the Capitol Development Committee.

Elections
Hooton was elected to the House of Representatives in 2016; she won the Democratic primary with 51.24% of the vote against opponent Angelique Espinoza and ran unopposed in the general election.

In 2022, Hooton initially ran for re-election to her District 10 state house seat. She ran unopposed in and won the Democratic primary held on June 28, 2022. However, in an undated statement released about August 1, 2022, Hooton announced she was dropping out of the race, stating "My husband Jim retired three years ago, and I want to spend more time with him and my adult children and pursue personal interests." A vacancy committee selected a replacement candidate for the November general election.

Election history

2016

2018

2020

2022

References

External links
Official campaign website

21st-century American politicians
Living people
Democratic Party members of the Colorado House of Representatives
Women state legislators in Colorado
Year of birth missing (living people)
21st-century American women politicians